Cinetodus froggatti, known as Froggatt's catfish or smallmouthed salmon catfish, is a species of sea catfish found in West Papua in Indonesia and Papua New Guinea where it is found in the Purari, Fly, Strickland and Digul River systems as well as in the Roper River system of Northwest Territories, Australia.

References

 Ramsay, E.P. and Ogibly, J.D. 1887. A contribution to the knowledge of the fish-fauna of New Guinea. Proceedings of the Linnean Society of New South Wales (Second Series) 1:8-20.
 

Cinetodus
Catfish of Oceania
Freshwater fish of Australia
Freshwater fish of Western New Guinea
Freshwater fish of Papua New Guinea
Taxonomy articles created by Polbot
Fish described in 1887